The Voice of Nepal is the Nepalese format of the international TV singing reality series called The Voice. The show usually have four different coaches (judges), which eventually form a four different team after the selection event called the Blind Audition. Each team has to go through the battle round where contestants are paired with one another within the same team and only half of the total selected contestants from the blind audition are selected for the knockout round. During the knockout round, based on The Voice format, only the best and strongest contestants who their respective coach consider the best overall are selected by their coaches. They also have the sole right to do this on his or her own and take them to the live round (Voting Round). During the live round event, through a series of voting episodes, only one contestant with the most popular vote will advance to the grand finale. The first season of the voice of Nepal was won by CD Vijaya Adhikari from Team Deep, season 2 was won by Ram Limbu from Team Pramod and season 3 was won by Kiran Gajmer from Team Pramod. The Grand Finale of season 1 was held on 14 December 2018 in Quatar stadium, the second season's Grand finale was held at Taragaon Open Field Chuchchepati Kathmandu on 7 December 2019 and the third season's Grand Finale was held in The Voice Studio, Dhumbarahi. The voice of Nepal was bought by Himalaya Television.

The host of the new series is Sushil Nepal (2018 onwards) and Oshin Sitoula (2018), the coaches are Deep Shrestha (season 1 onwards), Sanup Poudel (season 1), Abhaya Subba (season 1), Pramod Kharel (season 1, onwards), Raju Lama (season 2 onwards), Astha Raut (season 2) , Trishna Gurung (season 3), Prabisha Adhikari (season 4) , Rajesh Payal Rai(season 4) . The series is directed by Laxman Paudyal, the former director of season one of Nepal's first international franchise singing reality show, Nepal Idol.

Season summary

Season 1
The audition for the show (season 1) was taken using The Voice of Nepal app for iOS and Android. In total, 12,000 digital clips were received within 30 days, and it took 20 more days to select 108 participants, among whom include non-resident Nepali from Japan, Australia, Dubai, and India.

The first episode was broadcast on Kantipur TV and on Ramailo HD on 25 August 2018. The show times are every Saturday and Sunday 9:00 pm (NPT) onward.

Blind auditions

Episode 1 (August 25)
Color key

Episode 2 (August 26)

Episode 3 (September 1)

Episode 4 (September 2)

Episode 5 (September 8)

Episode 6 (September 9)

Episode 7 (September 15)

Episode 8 (September 16)

Episode 9 (September 22)

Episode 10 (September 23)

Coaches' teams
 Winning coach; winners are denoted by boldface.

Battle rounds

Episode 11 (September 29)

Episode 12 (September 30)

Episode 13 (October 6)

Episode 14 (October 7)

Episode 15 (October 13)

Episode 16 (October 14) 

Coaches teams after Battle Round.  (Stolen artists at the bottom).

Live shows
The live shows will begin on 27 October 2018.

Results summary
Result's color key
 Artist received the fewest votes and was eliminated 
 Artist was saved by coach
 Artist won the public vote
 Winner
 Runner-up
 Artist did not perform that week

Week 1: (27–28 October)
This episode aired from 8:30 pm to 10:30pm.

Week 2: (3–4 November)

Week 3: (10–11 November)

Week 4: (17–18 November)

Week 5: (24–25 November)

Week 6: (1–2 December)

Semi finals

Week 7: (8–9 December)

Finale

Season 2
The audition for The Voice of Nepal (season 2) was taken from The Voice of Nepal app for iOS and Android, and, for the first time, through various social media like Facebook as well. The coaches are Deep Shrestha, Pramod Kharel, Astha Raut and Raju Lama and the series is directed by Laxman Paudyal, the former director of season one of Nepal's first international franchise singing reality show, Nepal Idol. Abhaya Subba and Sanup Poudel were replaced in the season.

The season 2 of the show is broadcast on Himalaya Television.

Season 3

Blind Audition (01)
Blind auditions for The Voice of Nepal season 3 started on 19 March 2021 on Himalaya HD Television; the final audition ended on Saturday, 17 April with more than 150 contestants anticipated throughout the audition round. As usual, for the battle round, this season's coaches have successfully secured 64 top performers through the audition round.

Battle Round (02)
The new episode (Battle Round) started on 24 April 2021 and ended on 15 May of the same year, where all 16 selected performers from each coach battled against each other in pairs; only nine including one steal were able to advance to the knockout round.

Knockout round (03)
The Knockout Round was started on Friday, 4 June and was aired until 25 June 2021. All nine selected contestants from each coach, including steal, were divided into three different groups; only one outstanding performer from each divided group, in total three, were selected for the live round.

Live Round (04)
The Live Round started 2 July and lasted until Saturday, 17 July. All three contestants from each coach went through a voting format where the contestants with the lowest vote had to leave the show every week and only one final contestant advanced to the Grand Finale.

Grand Finale or Final Round (05)
Only one contestant who advanced to the Finale from the live round through voting from each coach was able to join this round. All four remaining total contestants from four different coaches battled against each other; the talent with the highest worldwide vote was declared as the winner of The Voice of Nepal season 3.

Battle Round

Episode 11 (April 24)

Episode 12 (April 25)

Episode 13 (April 30)

Episode 14 (May 01)

Episode 15 (May 07)

Episode 16 (May 08)

Episode 17 (May 14)

Episode 18 (May 15)

Coaches' teams after the Battle Round.  (Stolen artists at the bottom).

Knockout round

Coaches' teams after the knockout round.

Live Round

Season 4 
The digital audition for season 4 was started from April 29 to May 15, 2022.
There are four coaches in this season :- Pramod Kharel, Raju Lama, Prabisha Adhikari & Rajesh Payel Rai. 
Among the four coaches,Pramod kharel has won three voice winning awards including the voice of Nepal kids. 
Finalists:-
Team Pramod-Yogesh Magar
Team Raju-Karan Rai winner's season 4
Team Prabisha-Shahil Limbu
Team Rajesh-Sabina Yonghan limbu. The winner of the Season 4 VON is Karan Rai.

The Voice Kids 
The Voice of Kids is a junior version of The Voice of Nepal based on the original Dutch version. Digital auditions were opened in April 2021. Two coaches were also announced during the Grand Finale of The Voice of Nepal season 3. Prabisha Adhikari and Pramod Kharel were announced as the first two coaches of The Voice of Kids season 1. Raju Lama and Milan Newar were also announced through the official social media platforms of the show as the final two coaches. Contestants are required to be between the ages of 6 and 14. On February 24, 2023, it was announced that Sushant KC is the newest coach replacing Lama.
 Team Raju
 Team Prabisha 
 Team Milan 
 Team Pramod
 Team Sushant

Controversy
 Prior to the start of the second season, Abhaya Subba published a video titled "Dear Voice of Nepal, Give the right reasons.....", alleging malpractice in the management of the show. She asserted that the show annexed her as the judge in the second season without prior informing them.		
 After end of the second season, Top 4 contestant Bikash Limbu was rejected for the world tour which created controversy among show makers; the tour company and management department denied to clarify this controversy.

See also
 Nepal Idol
 Nepali Tara

References

External links 
 The Voice of Nepal News
 What is digital audition
 Why I love The Voice of Nepal

Nepal
Nepalese television shows
Nepalese television series
Nepalese reality television series
2018 Nepalese television series debuts